John Henry William Goodell (April 5, 1907 – September 21, 1993) was a pitcher in Major League Baseball. He played for the Chicago White Sox.

References

External links

1907 births
1993 deaths
Major League Baseball pitchers
Chicago White Sox players
Baseball players from Oklahoma
Sportspeople from Muskogee, Oklahoma